Coldwater Township is a civil township of Isabella County in the U.S. state of Michigan. The population was 737 at the 2000 census, making it the least-populated township in the county.

Communities 
 Brinton is an unincorporated community near the center of the township at  It was settled in 1862 and first known as "Letson" after storekeeper Samuel A. Letson, who was also the first postmaster when the post office was established on April 20, 1886. It was renamed on April 17, 1888 for Oscar T. Brinton. The post office operated until November 30, 1906.

Geography

Demographics
As of the census of 2000, there were 737 people, 277 households, and 222 families residing in the township.  The population density was 20.5 per square mile (7.9/km2).  There were 405 housing units at an average density of 11.3 per square mile (4.4/km2).  The racial makeup of the township was 95.79% White, 0.54% African American, 1.49% Native American, 0.41% Asian, 0.41% from other races, and 1.36% from two or more races. Hispanic or Latino of any race were 1.76% of the population.

There were 277 households, out of which 31.0% had children under the age of 18 living with them, 65.0% were married couples living together, 7.9% had a female householder with no husband present, and 19.5% were non-families. 16.2% of all households were made up of individuals, and 8.7% had someone living alone who was 65 years of age or older.  The average household size was 2.66 and the average family size was 2.94.

In the township the population was spread out, with 25.0% under the age of 18, 6.8% from 18 to 24, 26.6% from 25 to 44, 25.9% from 45 to 64, and 15.7% who were 65 years of age or older.  The median age was 40 years. For every 100 females, there were 107.0 males.  For every 100 females age 18 and over, there were 107.9 males.

The median income for a household in the township was $34,853, and the median income for a family was $39,375. Males had a median income of $31,528 versus $23,523 for females. The per capita income for the township was $16,477.  About 6.1% of families and 6.9% of the population were below the poverty line, including 8.9% of those under age 18 and 4.1% of those age 65 or over.

References

Townships in Isabella County, Michigan
Townships in Michigan